Uguccione (also Huguccio or Hugutio) may refer to:

Huguccio (d. 1210), canon lawyer and bishop
Uguccione da Pisa (fl. c. 1200), grammarian
Uguccione della Faggiuola (d. 1319), condottiero, ruler of Pisa, Lucca and Forlì
Uguccione Borromeo (d. 1329), bishop of Novara
Francesco Uguccione (d. 1412), archbishop of Bordeaux